The 1997–98 Cypriot Second Division was the 43rd season of the Cypriot second-level football league. Olympiakos won their 2nd title.

Format
Fourteen teams participated in the 1997–98 Cypriot Second Division. All teams played against each other twice, once at their home and once away. The team with the most points at the end of the season crowned champions. The first three teams were promoted to 1998–99 Cypriot First Division and the last three teams were relegated to the 1998–99 Cypriot Third Division.

Changes from previous season
Teams promoted to 1997–98 Cypriot First Division
 AEL Limassol
 Evagoras Paphos
 Ethnikos Assia

Teams relegated from 1996–97 Cypriot First Division
 Aris Limassol
 Olympiakos Nicosia
 APEP

Teams promoted from 1996–97 Cypriot Third Division
 Rotsidis Mammari
 Iraklis Gerolakkou 
 ASIL Lysi

Teams relegated to 1997–98 Cypriot Third Division
 Achyronas Liopetriou 
 AEZ Zakakiou
 AEK Kakopetrias

League standings

Results

See also
 Cypriot Second Division
 1997–98 Cypriot First Division
 1997–98 Cypriot Cup

Sources

Cypriot Second Division seasons
Cyprus
1997–98 in Cypriot football